Gunilla Hutton (born May 15, 1944) is a Swedish-born American actress and singer, perhaps best known for her roles as the second Billie Jo Bradley (1965–1966) on Petticoat Junction and as a regular cast member in the television series Hee Haw until 1992. She was raised in Fort Worth, Texas.

During her lone season on Petticoat Junction (1965–66), Hutton appeared in 23 of its 34 episodes.

She appeared in Perry Mason, The Love Boat, and Murder Can Hurt You (1980). In 2015, she appeared in a MeTV commercial promoting Petticoat Junction with cast members Linda Kaye Henning and Lori Saunders.

Personal life
Born Gunilla Wiklund, she attended Arlington Heights High School in Fort Worth, Texas. She appeared on such game shows as Match Game, Password, and Family Feud.

She had an extramarital relationship with Nat King Cole. Hutton telephoned Cole's wife Maria Cole to tell her to divorce him. Maria, in turn, confronted her husband, and Cole ended the relationship with Hutton after being diagnosed with terminal lung cancer.

Discography

Singles
 "You Can Say the Prettiest Things Sometimes / The Greatest Story Never Told" (1972)
 "Chowchilla Dust / We've Got Old Fashioned Love" (1973)
 "You're Gonna Get Loved / See the Lady Cryin" (1974)
 "Cody / The End of Our Love Song" (1975)

References

External links

1944 births
Living people
American television actresses
American women singers
People from Fort Worth, Texas
Swedish emigrants to the United States
Actresses from Texas
21st-century American women